The swan mussel, Anodonta cygnea, is a large species of freshwater mussel, an aquatic bivalve mollusc in the family Unionidae, the river mussels.

Because of its morphological variability and its wide range of distribution, there are over 500 synonyms for this species.

Shell description
The shell is thin but large (approximately 10 to 20 cm) and rather flat, even at the umbo. The shell color is often pale greenish or brownish. It differs from Anodonta anatina in being larger shell with straighter, more parallel dorsal and ventral margins; the growth lines of the inner, oldest part of the shell are finer and shallower, and reach the margin.

Distribution
Its native distribution is European-Siberian. The geographical distribution of this species is from the British Isles east to Siberia, and south into northern Africa.
 Croatia
 Czech Republic – in Bohemia, in Moravia, vulnerable (VU); Czech code, Decree for implementation, No. 395/1992 Sb. (and No. 175/2006 Sb.) – highly threatened species
 Germany– highly endangered (stark gefährdet); listed as a specially protected species in annex 1 in Bundesartenschutzverordnung
 The Netherlands
 Poland – endangered
 Slovakia
 Sweden – quite rare
 British Isles including Ireland
 Italy
 Portugal
 Denmark
 Philippines

Habitat

This species is found in rivers and lakes. They have a strong pungent odor and are used by carp fisherman as bait.

References

External links

Anodonta
Molluscs described in 1758
Taxa named by Carl Linnaeus